Son Woong-jung (born 10 June 1962) is a South Korean former footballer who played as a forward. He is the father of current South Korea national team captain Son Heung-min.

Playing career 
Son joined Myongji University in 1984 after graduating from high school. He scored the winning goal four minutes before the end of the Korean President's Cup final, contributing to Myongji's first national title.

Son spent his senior career in Sangmu FC, Hyundai Horang-i, and Ilhwa Chunma. He was also selected for the South Korea national football B team in 1987.

Honours
Myongji University
Korean President's Cup: 1984

References

External links 
 슈퍼루키 獨함부르크 손흥민 키운 ‘사커 대디’ 손웅정의 눈물과 웃음
 

1962 births
Living people
South Korean footballers
South Korea B international footballers
Ulsan Hyundai FC players
Gimcheon Sangmu FC players
K League 1 players
Association football forwards
People from Seosan
Sportspeople from South Chungcheong Province